Rib Mountain is a mountain that straddles the border between the municipalities of Latchford, Timiskaming District and Temagami, Nipissing District in Northeastern Ontario, Canada. It divides Friday Lake on the east and Rib Lake on the west.

References

Mountains of Ontario
Landforms of Temagami
Landforms of Timiskaming District
Mountains of Canada under 1000 metres